John Bromwich defeated Dinny Pails 5–7, 6–3, 7–5, 3–6, 6–2 in the final to win the men's singles tennis title at the 1946 Australian Championships.

Seeds
The seeded players are listed below. John Bromwich is the champion; others show the round in which they were eliminated.

 John Bromwich (champion)
 Adrian Quist (semifinals)
 Dinny Pails (finalist)
 Harry Hopman (quarterfinals)
 Jack Crawford (third round)
 Geoffrey Brown (semifinals)
 Lionel Brodie (quarterfinals)
 Jack Harper (quarterfinals)

Draw

Key
 Q = Qualifier
 WC = Wild card
 LL = Lucky loser
 r = Retired

Finals

Earlier rounds

Section 1

Section 2

Section 3

Section 4

External links
 

1946 in Australian tennis
1946
Men's Singles